Blue (originally, Whittum) is an unincorporated community in Greenlee County, Arizona, United States.  It lies  (33.6100552, -109.1067396), at an elevation of 5,758 feet (1,755 m).  

Blue has a ZIP Code of 85922; in 2000, the population of the 85922 ZCTA was 36.  In addition to its post office, Blue also contains a public library, and a public school serving all grade levels.

History
The community was originally named for Nat Whittum, an original settler who was killed at the site in 1891. A post office was established at Whittum in 1894; however, its name was changed to Blue in 1898, because everyone knew where the Blue River was but Whittum was not known. 

Blue's population was 80 in 1940.

Climate

Education
Blue School District 22 is the area school district, serving K-12. In 1984 Randy Collier of The Arizona Republic stated due to difficulties in transportation and from being far from other places, "the social life at Blue primarily is at the school."

Previously Blue had a K-8 school, so Round Valley High School in Eagar, of the Round Valley Unified School District, served Blue for high school; some students lived with relatives in Eagar and some traveled to and from Eagar via school bus.

Greenlee County Library System maintains the Blue Public Library in a log cabin adjacent to the Blue School.

References

Unincorporated communities in Greenlee County, Arizona
Unincorporated communities in Arizona